Jaílson de Lima Araújo (born 21 January 1991) is a Brazilian footballer who plays as a right back for Al-Talaba.

Career
Born in Paraíba, Jaílson is a youth product of Centro Sportivo Paraibano. He spent his first year as professional, on a loan deal to Grêmio Anápolis, joining them on 12 December 2012. and competing in the Campeonato Goiano.

On 5 August 2013, Jaílson moved abroad and joined Paços de Ferreira on a loan deal. He was intended as a replacement for Sevilla bound, Diogo Figueiras.

He made his professional debut for Paços de Ferreira on 9 February 2014, in an away loss to FC Porto. and amassed 23 appearances during the season. On 30 June 2015, Araújo moved to Arouca as a replacement for Ivan Balliu, signing a one-year deal. A year later, he signed another one-year deal, now with Tondela.

Omonia Nicosia
On 1 August 2017, Cypriot First Division club Omonia Nicosia announced the signing of Jailson. On 26 May 2018 Jailson officially became an Omonia Nicosia player after the team bought him from the club he was loaned from as a resold of his good appearances despite the bad season that the club had.

Club statistics

References

External links

1991 births
Living people
Sportspeople from Paraíba
Brazilian footballers
Association football defenders
Centro Sportivo Paraibano players
C.D. Aves players
F.C. Paços de Ferreira players
F.C. Arouca players
C.D. Tondela players
AC Omonia players
Nea Salamis Famagusta FC players
Al-Talaba SC players
Cypriot First Division players
Iraqi Premier League players
Primeira Liga players
Expatriate footballers in Portugal
Expatriate footballers in Cyprus
Expatriate footballers in Iraq
Brazilian expatriate sportspeople in Portugal
Brazilian expatriate footballers